This is a list of electoral results for the Electoral district of Ballajura in Western Australian elections.

Members for Ballajura

Election results

Elections in the 2000s

Elections in the 1990s

References

Western Australian state electoral results by district